Raymond John Fairfax (born 14 November 1941) is an English former footballer who played for Northampton Town and West Bromwich Albion.

References

1941 births
Living people
English footballers
Association football defenders
English Football League players
West Bromwich Albion F.C. players
Northampton Town F.C. players
Wellingborough Town F.C. players
Olney Town F.C. players
Sportspeople from Smethwick